Terminus Henri-Bourassa  Nord, also known as Terminus Laval and Terminus Henri-Bourassa Sud are a twin RTM bus terminus connected to one another by a tunnel under Henri Bourassa Boulevard. Terminus Henri-Bourassa Nord is located at 10765, rue Lajeunesse north of Henri Bourassa Blvd in Montreal just south of the Viau bridge. Terminus Henri-Bourassa Sud is located at 590 Henri Bourassa Boulevard East next to the Henri-Bourassa Metro station.

Connecting bus routes
Before the Orange Line of the Montreal Metro was extended into Laval in 2007, 28 of the 34 Société de transport de Laval (STL) bus routes ended here, at the north terminal. Most of those routes (or their successors) were modified to terminate at either Montmorency or Cartier stations. Some inter municipal bus routes were also modified to take advantage of the closer stations. This leaves the old large north facility underutilised, and the waiting room (including the toilets) was closed as of Monday January 21, 2008, with the rest of the terminus closed in late 2015. All platforms at the rebuilt south annex are completely used by all buses.

Current bus routes

Nearby points of interest

 Aréna Ahuntsic 
 Bibliothèque Ahuntsic 
 Cégep Bois-de-Boulogne(with STM buses 164 or 171)
 SAAQ(with STM buses 164 or 171) 
 Parc Ahuntsic
 Gary Carter Stadium
 Parc-nature de l'Île de la Visitation(with STM buses 48, 49, or 69) 
 Maison de la culture Ahuntsic/Cartierville
 Ahuntsic Bridge

References

External links

 2011 STM System Map
 STL Website 
CRT Lanaudière
MRC Les Moulins
 STL 2009 System Map 
 STL 2011 map 
STL Schedules

Exo bus stations